The Tour of the Reservoir is a two-day road bicycle race around the Derwent Reservoir, Northumberland in the north of England, part of the British Premier Calendar.

Winners

References

Cycle races in England
Recurring sporting events established in 2005
2005 establishments in England